The Lincoln Blue Tigers are the sports teams of Lincoln University in Jefferson City, Missouri. The Blue Tigers participate at the NCAA Division II level in Mid-America Intercollegiate Athletics Association (MIAA). Lincoln competed in the MIAA from 1970 to 1999 when it left due to not sponsoring a football team since 1989. The university competed in the Heartland Conference from 1999 to 2010, of which, Lincoln is a founding conference member. The school revitalized its football program and reentered the MIAA in 2010.

Sports sponsored

Women's track and field
The Lincoln Blue Tigers women's track and field team made NCAA Division II history by winning the Outdoor Track and Field Championships five consecutive times, from 2003 to 2007.  They won a sixth title in 2009 and a seventh in 2014.

Former programs
In May 2016 Lincoln dropped its baseball and women's tennis programs. In June 2020 due to the COVID-19 pandemic Lincoln dropped its women's bowling program.

National championships
The Blue Tigers have won fourteen NCAA Division II team championships.

Team

Songs

Fight song
Lincoln University doesn't have a name for their fight song, but it is sung to the tune of "The Washington and Lee Swing".

Alma mater
Sung to the tune of "Ach, wie ist's möglich dann", an old German folk song published in 1827 and variously credited to Friedrich Wilhelm Kücken or Friedrich Silcher, Lincoln's fight song is called "Lincoln, O, Lincoln". (The West Point and Wake Forest alma maters also use the same tune.)

Notable alumni
 Dusty Decker, Negro league infielder
 Leo Lewis, member of the Canadian Football Hall of Fame
 Zeke Moore, National Football League (NFL) defensive back
 Lemar Parrish, eight-time Pro Bowl NFL defensive back in the 1970s and early 1980s, head coach of the Blue Tiger football team from 2005 to 2008

References

External links